Malcolm Elmore Beard (February 21, 1919 – January 2, 2019) was an American politician from the state of Florida.

Biography 
Beard was born on February 21, 1919, in Moultrie, Georgia. He moved to Florida with his family in 1924, served in the United States Navy during World War II, and attended the University of Tampa. Beard worked for the Tampa Police Department from the 1940s until he was elected sheriff of Hillsborough County in 1964, ousting incumbent sheriff Ed Blackburn in what the Tampa Bay Times would later describe as "a tight, bitterly contested race — the last time Hillsborough County saw a truly competitive race for the office."
He served as sheriff until 1978. Beard served in the Florida House of Representatives from 1978 to 1980.
In 1979, he was elected to the State Senate for the 22nd district, and he served until 1996. In 1985, he changed districts and parties, sitting for the 23rd district as a Republican. The Hillsborough County Sheriff's Office's Malcolm E. Beard Sheriff's Operations Center was named after him in 2013. He died on January 2, 2019, one month before his 100th birthday.

References

External links

|-

|-

1919 births
2019 deaths
Members of the Florida House of Representatives
Florida state senators
People from Moultrie, Georgia
Politicians from Tampa, Florida
Military personnel from Florida
Florida sheriffs
Florida Democrats
Florida Republicans
University of Tampa alumni
United States Navy personnel of World War II
20th-century American politicians